Drummond Township, which comprises Drummond Island, is a civil township of Chippewa County in the U.S. state of Michigan. The population was 973 at the 2020 census.

Drummond Island is the seventh-largest lake island in the world. M-134 extends from the mainland to run through the western portion of the island, connecting with the mainland via the Drummond Island Ferry, which runs between the island and DeTour Village.

On the east side of Drummond Island, the Canada–United States border passes through the False Detour Channel. On the other side of that channel, the Canadian Cockburn Island separates Drummond from Manitoulin Island.

Communities
M-134 ends south of the community.
 Johnswood is an unincorporated community on the NE shore of Scammon Cove, near the SW part of Drummond Island.

History

The township and island are named after Gordon Drummond, the first Canadian-born officer to command the military and the civil government of British Canada. As Lieutenant Governor of Upper Canada, Drummond distinguished himself on the Niagara front in the War of 1812 and later became Governor-General and Administrator of Canada. The Ojibwe name for the island is Bootaagan-minising (syncope as Bootaagan-mnising recorded as "Potagannissing"), meaning "at the Mill Island".

The history of Drummond Island dates back centuries, but more recent history of the past 200 years relates to the British occupation of the island during and after the War of 1812. The island was the last British outpost on American soil following the Treaty of Ghent (1814). On October 6, 1828, orders were sent out from Quebec that the post would be handed over, and the island was officially occupied by United States on November 14, 1828. Drummond Island is the only island in the Manitoulin Island chain which is part of the United States. Drummond Island was originally recorded by Americans as First Manitoulin Island and Drummond's Island.

Border on the Great Lakes

British and American negotiators to the 1814 Treaty of Ghent ended the War of 1812 by offering no territorial concessions to either side, but returned to those boundaries set by the Treaty of Paris of 1783. To resolve territorial claims that had precipitated the war, negotiators at Ghent established a process whereby commissioners would survey the boundary to determine the borders envisioned in the original treaty.

Beginning in August 1820, two teams of surveyors, including British explorer and cartographer David Thompson, mapped the area of St. Joseph Island, Drummond Island, and Lesser and Greater Manitou Islands (today Cockburn and Manitoulin islands). Mapping this corner of Lake Huron was a challenge given that little was known about the shores and depths of the channels between the islands. The agent for the United States survey team, Major Joseph Delafield, complained, "No map that I have seen has any truth as it respects the position of Drummond's or the other islands about St. Marys. We entered this bay without a pilot, but are told we cannot proceed up river without one."

Based on the surveys taken in the summers of 1820 and 1821, and guided by the commission's two principles that the boundary would not divide islands and that the number of islands would be apportioned equally between the two countries, in November and December 1821, commissioners agreed to grant St. Joseph Island and Cockburn Island to Canada and Drummond Island, which lies between them, to the United States.

Geography

The island is dominated by forest, with cliffs on the eastern side, which are part of the Niagara Escarpment.

The island hosts a rare environment known as alvar, a grassy limestone plain found only in a few places worldwide.

Drummond Township is one of only seven municipalities in the state of Michigan to consist entirely of islands, including Grosse Ile Township, St. James Township, Bois Blanc Township, Mackinac Island, Peaine Township, and Sugar Island Township.

Major highway 

  is the sole highway serving the island. The Drummond Island Ferry connects M-134 to the island from DeTour Village. West of there, M-134 parallels the shore of Lake Huron, until it meets I-75 near St. Ignace. It is one of three state trunkline highways on islands in Michigan; the others being M-154 on Harsens Island, and M-185 on Mackinac Island.

Climate

Demographics
As of the 2000 United States Census, there were 992 people, 467 households, and 309 families in the township. The population density was 7.7 per square mile (3.0/km). There were 1,476 housing units at an average density of 11.4 per square mile (4.4/km). The racial makeup of the township was 90.83% White, 4.84% Native American, 0.10% from other races, 4.03% from two or more races and 0.20% African American. Hispanic or Latino of any race were 0.71% of the population.

There were 467 households, out of which 18.2% had children under the age of 18 living with them, 58.5% were married couples living together, 3.9% had a female householder with no husband present, and 33.8% were non-families. 29.3% of all households were made up of individuals, and 10.5% had someone living alone who was 65 years of age or older. The average household size was 2.12 and the average family size was 2.59.

The township population contained 16.9% under the age of 18, 3.9% from 18 to 24, 20.9% from 25 to 44, 35.3% from 45 to 64, and 23.0% who were 65 years of age or older. The median age was 51 years. For every 100 females, there were 107.1 males. For every 100 females age 18 and over, there were 103.0 males.

The median income for a household in the township was $36,131, and the median income for a family was $39,931. Males had a median income of $35,729 versus $24,250 for females. The per capita income for the township was $21,963. About 7.6% of families and 9.0% of the population were below the poverty line, including 6.3% of those under age 18 and 7.9% of those age 65 or over.

See also
List of populated islands of the Great Lakes
Jasper conglomerate (Drummond Island puddingstone)
Niagara Escarpment
Gordon Drummond
War of 1812
Drummond Island Airport

References

External links
 Drummond Township, Michigan
 Drummond Island Tourism Association
Kelley, J.G., (2009) Drummond Island Puddingstone. Drummond Island Tourism Association, Drummond Island, Michigan.

Townships in Chippewa County, Michigan
Populated places on Lake Huron in the United States
Niagara Escarpment
Townships in Michigan